Neysan District is a district (bakhsh) in Hoveyzeh County, Khuzestan Province, Iran. At the 2006 census, its population was 8,227, in 1,335 families.  The district has one city: Rafi. The district has two rural districts (dehestan): Bani Saleh Rural District and Neysan Rural District.

References 

Hoveyzeh County
Districts of Khuzestan Province